Ceremonial Sitting of the State Council on 7 May 1901 Marking the Centenary of its Foundation is an oil on canvas painting of 1903 by the Russian artist Ilya Repin. The State Council (Russian Empire) had its centenary at the Mariinsky Palace marked by Repin's work. Repin quickly sketched while in the room, and later expanded this into the full painting with the aid of assistants Boris Kustodiev and Ivan Kulikov. The photorealism of the painting was noted in its time. 

The painting is in the collection of the Russian Museum, Saint Petersburg.

References 

1903 paintings
Paintings by Ilya Repin
Collections of the Russian Museum